Chen Liming (born 20 April 1987 in Guangzhou, China), is a Chinese-born Hong Kong footballer who is currently a free agent.

References

External links
HKFA

1987 births
Living people
Footballers from Guangzhou
Association football forwards
Hong Kong footballers
Tai Po FC players
R&F (Hong Kong) players
Happy Valley AA players
Hong Kong Premier League players
Hong Kong First Division League players